The Women's 200 Butterfly at the 10th FINA World Swimming Championships (25m) was swum on 15 December in Dubai, United Arab Emirates. 30 swimmers swam the preliminary heats, with the top-8 advancing to the final that evening.

Records
Prior to the competition, the existing world and championship records were as follows.

The following records were established during the competition:

Results

Heats

Final

References

Butterfly 200 metre, Women's
World Short Course Swimming Championships
2010 in women's swimming